TurboAnt X7 Pro is a foldable electric kick scooter from TurboAnt. Its performance is comparable to the Xiaomi M365 scooter.

Design  
The TurboAnt X7 Pro is powered by an electric front hub motor while the battery is detachable on the stem, and can reach a speed of up to 20 mph (32 km/h). The triple braking system, which consists of a responsive rear disc brake, a front electronic brake,and a foot brake, is activated by pulling the hand brake lever. It has a folding mechanism, which makes transportation easier in multiple scenarios such as in the bus or subway.

TurboAnt X7 Max 
The successor, called the X7 Max,  has "refined" the original X7 Pro by including a stem battery lock and an increased range of 32-mile. The length and width of the deck has also been widened and elevated for a safer and more comfortable standing position as well as smoother riding when passing bumps.

External links 
About Us - TurboAnt

References 

Electric scooters
Kick scooters